Maryland Route 263 (MD 263) is a state highway in the U.S. state of Maryland.  Known as Plum Point Road, the state highway runs  from MD 2/MD 4 near Huntingtown east to a dead end at Plum Point.  MD 263 also connects Prince Frederick with the northeastern Calvert County towns of Chesapeake Beach and North Beach; access to the towns is provided through a connection with MD 261 at Parran.  The state highway was constructed in the late 1920s.

Route description

The state highway heads northeast as a two-lane undivided road that immediately crosses Hunting Creek and passes through a forested area with scattered residential subdivisions. MD 263 passes by both ends of its old alignment, which is unsigned MD 761 (Old Plum Point Road), on its way to the community of Parran. Within the community, the state highway intersects Emmanuel Church Road, which leads south to the historic home Cornehill. East of Parran, the roadway continues northeast as MD 261 (Willows Road) toward Chesapeake Beach and North Beach while MD 263 veers east toward Plum Point. MD 263 crosses Plum Point Creek and intersects Wilson Road, which heads south toward Dares Beach, in the community of Plum Point. The state highway intersects Ridge Road, which heads north into the center of the beach community, before it reaches its eastern terminus at a dead end just west of the Chesapeake Bay shoreline.

History
The state highway was constructed to Plum Point in 1929 and 1930. MD 263 was widened and paved with bituminous concrete from MD 2 to MD 261 around 1959. The directional crossover intersection at the state highway's western terminus with MD 2/MD 4 was installed in 2007.

Junction list

See also

References

External links

MDRoads: MD 263
Maryland Roads - MD 263

263
Maryland Route 263